Eli Nichols (1799 - 1871) was a farmer, lawyer, and abolitionist in Ohio. He was involved with the Underground Railroad. He was born in Loudoun County, Virginia, and moved with his family to Newcastle Township, Coshocton County, Ohio. He served in the Ohio legislature. He was a “conductor” on the Underground Railroad. His wife Rachel Nichols wrote passages promoting liberty and also wrote poems. He died on his farm in Walhonding.

References

External links

1799 births
1871 deaths
Farmers from Ohio
Underground Railroad people
Members of the Ohio General Assembly
19th-century American lawyers
19th-century American politicians
Ohio lawyers
People from Loudoun County, Virginia
People from Coshocton County, Ohio